United Nations Security Council resolution 640, adopted unanimously on 29 August 1989, after reaffirming resolutions 431 (1978), 435 (1978), 629 (1989) and 632 (1989), the Council reminded all parties involved in the situation in Namibia implement Resolution 435 of 29 September 1978.

The Council went on to demand the disbandment of paramilitary organisations including the Koevoet and their command structures.

Resolution 640 requested the Secretary-General Javier Pérez de Cuéllar review the situation on the ground with regards to the number of police monitors, the adequacy of the military component of the United Nations Transition Assistance Group, ensuring legislation for the election conforms with the United Nations plan and internationally accepted norms. It also asked him to ensure impartial media coverage of the elections, appealing to all parties concerned to co-operate with him to ensure the full implementation of Resolution 435.

See also
 List of United Nations Security Council Resolutions 601 to 700 (1987–1991)
 South African Border War
 Resolutions 629, 632 and 643
 Apartheid
 South West Africa People's Organization
 United Nations Commissioner for Namibia

References
Text of the Resolution at undocs.org

External links
 

 0640
1989 in South Africa
1989 in South West Africa
 0640
 0640
August 1989 events